Teesri Kasam is a 1966 Hindi language drama film directed by Basu Bhattacharya and produced by lyricist Shailendra. It is based on the short story Mare Gaye Gulfam, by the Hindi novelist Phanishwarnath Renu. The film stars Raj Kapoor and Waheeda Rehman. The duo Shankar–Jaikishan composed the film's score. The film's cinematography was done by Subrata Mitra. Dialogues were written by Phanishwarnath Renu and the screenplay by Nabendu Ghosh.

Teesri Kasam is an unconventional film that portrays rural Indian society. It is the story of a naive bullock cart driver Hiraman, who falls in love with Hirabai, a dancer at a nautanki. The film also deals with the issue of exploitation of women in the performing arts, especially in travelling folk theatre.

Teesri Kasam emerged as a box-office bomb, a flop upon its release but won President's medal for best film (National award for best film).

Synopsis
After nearly getting arrested, Hiraman promises to himself that he will never assist any black-marketeer nor transport bamboo. This incident does cost him his bullock-cart but he did manage to get his two oxen away in time. He manages to save enough money to buy another cart, and is hired to take a female on a 30-hour ride to a Mela. He subsequently finds that his passenger is an attractive woman, Hira Bai, and he falls in love with her - little knowing that she is a traveling courtesan - and it is this attraction that will get him into a physical altercation as well as in the bad books of Thakur Vikram Singh.

Plot 
Hiraman (Raj Kapoor) is a rustic villager, a bullock cart driver, from a remote village in Bihar. Hiraman takes two vows based on difficult situations in his life. He then meets and befriends Hirabai, a nautanki dancer. In the end, Hiraman takes a third vow.

Hiraman has traditional and conservative values. While smuggling illegal goods on his bullock cart and narrowly escaping the police, Hiraman takes a vow (the first kasam) to never again carry illegal goods. Subsequently, while transporting bamboo for a timber trader, Hiraman's load upsets the horses of two men. The two men then beat Hiraman. After this, Hiraman takes a second vow (the second kasam) to never again carry bamboo in his cart.

One night, Hiraman is asked to carry Hirabai (Waheeda Rehman), a nautanki dancer, as a passenger to a village fair forty miles away. As they travel together, Hiraman sings to pass the time and tells Hirabai the story of the legend of Mahua. As the journey progresses, Hirabai is mesmerized by Hiraman's innocence and his simple philosophy of life. Hiraman sees Hirabai as an angel of purity.

Once they reach the village fair, Hiraman joins his band of bullock cart drivers and Hirabai joins the nautanki company. Hirabai asks Hiraman to stay at the village fair for a few days to see her dance. Hirabai arranges free passes for Hiraman and his friends to see the nautanki on every night for the duration of the fair.

As Hiraman attends the nautanki, he becomes aware that other people see Hirabai as a prostitute and this disturbs him. He tries to shield and protect her from society. As the days pass, the bond between Hirabai and Hiraman grows stronger. When Hiraman becomes involved in fights with local people who disparage Hirabai and her profession, Hirabai tries to make him understand that it is the harsh reality of her life. Hiraman asks Hirabai to leave her profession and to start living a respectable life. Hirabai refuses to leave. Feeling depressed, Hiraman leaves the village fair and returns to his village.

Hirabai meets  Hiraman and tells him her secret that she had been sold and she was not a virgin beauty and then leaves. Hiraman then takes a third vow (teesri kasam) that he will never again carry a nautanki company dancer in his cart.

Cast 
 Raj Kapoor as Meeta, Hiraman
 Waheeda Rehman as Hirabai
 Dulari as Hiraman's bhabhi (sister in law)
 Iftekhar as Thakur Vikram Singh
 Keshto Mukherji as Shivratan
 A.K. Hangal as Hiraman's older brother
 Asit Sen as mela announcer
 C. S. Dubey as Birju
 Shailendra
 Rehana
 Rekha
 Navendu Ghosh
 Vishwa Mehera
 Shivaji Bhai
 Mansaram
 B. Periera

Production

Development and Pre-production 
Phanishwarnath Renu who wrote the original short story Mare Gaye Gulfam in 1954, also wrote the script. The screenplay was written by Nabendu Ghosh, whose works include Devdas (1955), Sujata (1959) and Bandini (1963). Basu Bhattacharya directed the film with a sense of realism and natural style. He felt it was important for the film that Raj Kapoor should avoid his usual "simple man" mannerisms. Shailendra acquired Mare gaye gulfam rights and initially Mehmood and Meena Kumari was selected for the role of Hiraman and Hirabai. Raj Kapoor charged only one rupee to do Teesri Kasam, He advised Shailendra to add some commercial elements in this film, in this heartbreaking sad story but the producer did not agree to it and did the movie the way he wanted.

Lata Mangeshkar, Manna Dey, Asha Bhosle, Suman Kalyanpur, Shankar- Shambhu and Mukesh did playback singing.

Principal photography 

Shailendra wanted to film this movie in Terai area of Bihar but the stories of dacoits and robbers there forced him to shoot this film somewhere else. The filming took place at Igatpuri near Nasik The filming took many years to complete. Indoor filming took place at R.K. Studio, Shree Sound Studios and Kamal studio in Bombay (now Mumbai). Basu Bhattacharya wanted Raj and Waheeda Rehman perform in natural way. Raj Kapoor thought the ending of the film should be tweaked and Hirabai and Hiraman should go away together, but no one agreed to him. Most of the outdoor sequences filmed  at Aurahi Hingna, Araria district in Bihar and Bina, a town near Bhopal, Madhya Pradesh. A few scenes were filmed at Powai Lake and at Mohan Studios in Mumbai.  A set of Gulababag fair's The Great Bharat nautanki (drama) company was created in Mumbai studio. Subrata Mitra, the cinematographer on Satyajit Ray's early films, had moved to Mumbai for a brief period to make Merchant Ivory films. The theatre actor A. K. Hangal, knew Shailender from IPTA theatre group days, and agreed to play the small role of Hiraman's elder brother. However, eventually much of his role was cut in the final editing to reduce the length of the film.

Lachchu Maharaj and Rama Devi did this film's choreography. Nautanki supervised by Shankar- Shambhu. Desh Mukharjee was art director.

Post-Production

G.G. Mayekar (A.F.E) did editing of this movie.

Crew 

 Basu Bhattacharya, director
 Phanishwar Nath Renu, story and dialogue
 Nabendu Ghosh, screenplay
 Shailendra, producer
 G. G. Mayekar, editor
 Subrata Mitra, cinematographer
 Desh Mukherjee, artistic director
 Pandit Shivram, costume
 Lachhu Maharaj, choreographer
 Shankar Jaikishan, director of music
 Hasrat Jaipuri, Shailendra, lyricist
 Asha Bhosle, Manna Dey, Suman Kalyanpur, Lata Mangeshkar, Mubarak Begum, Mukesh, Shambhu-Shankar (qawwal), playback singers.

Music

Reception 
Teesri Kasam was well received by critics and took the National Film Award for Best Feature Film; however, it proved to be a commercial failure at the box-office. Bhattacharya turned to middle cinema (a meeting of mainstream Bollywood and art house cinema). Over the years, the film came to be regarded as a classic. 

Raj Kapoor himself did not liked this film and criticised the Teesri Kasam's director Basu Bhattacharya, in an interview in 1977 with India Today he said, "Basu (Basu Bhattacharya) is a pseudo, and I didn't like the film. He was risking somebody else's money. What did he have to lose?"

Both Kapoor and Rehman received acclaim for their performances in the film. While critics felt that Raj Kapoor delivered one of the most sensitive performances of his career after Jagte Raho (1956).

A chapter titled 'Teesri Kasam Ke Shilpkar Shailendra' ("The Architect of Teesri Kasam Shailendra") (Devnagari: तीसरी कसम के शिल्पकार शैलेंद्र) which is based on the film is included in CBSE class 10 Hindi Course-B Textbook Sparsh (Bhag 2) ("Touch (Part 2)") (Devnagari : स्पर्श (भाग – 2)). After being defunct for several years this chapter was recently brought back in course

Awards and nominations

References

Bibliography

External links

 

1966 films
1960s Hindi-language films
Films scored by Shankar–Jaikishan
Best Feature Film National Film Award winners
Films based on short fiction
Films set in Bihar
Films shot in Madhya Pradesh
Indian black-and-white films
Films shot in Mumbai
Films about musical theatre
Films shot in Bihar
Films directed by Basu Bhattacharya

new:तीसरी क़सम (सन् १९६६या संकिपा)